Duhabi is a municipality in Sunsari District in the Koshi Zone of south-eastern Nepal. At the time of the 2001 Nepal census it had a population of 17,574.
Duhabi is situated in between Itahari and Biratnagar, on the bank of Budi River. It is the center of Sunsari–Morang industrial corridor.

References 

Populated places in Sunsari District
Municipalities in Koshi Province
Nepal municipalities established in 2014
Municipalities in Sunsari District